Javier Octavio Concepción Rojas (born 27 December 1997) is a Cuban volleyball player. He is part of the Cuban national team. He participated at the Olympic Games Rio 2016. At the professional club level, he plays for Stade Poitevin Poitiers.

Sporting achievements

Youth national team
 2017  U21 Pan American Cup
 2017  FIVB U21 World Championship
 2018  U23 Pan American Cup

Individual awards
 2017: U21 Pan American Cup – Best Middle Blocker

References

External links
 Player profile at PlusLiga.pl 
 Player profile at Volleybox.net

1997 births
Living people
People from Havana
Cuban men's volleyball players
Olympic volleyball players of Cuba
Volleyball players at the 2016 Summer Olympics
Pan American Games medalists in volleyball
Pan American Games silver medalists for Cuba
Volleyball players at the 2019 Pan American Games
Medalists at the 2019 Pan American Games
Cuban expatriate sportspeople in Argentina
Expatriate volleyball players in Argentina
Cuban expatriate sportspeople in Poland
Expatriate volleyball players in Poland
Cuban expatriate sportspeople in France
Expatriate volleyball players in France
AZS Olsztyn players
Middle blockers
21st-century Cuban people